Walang daigdig (No Worlds) is a 1960 action film directed by Pablo Santiago and written by Tommy C. David. It stars Fernando Poe Jr., Zaldy Zshornack, Cielito Legaspi, Ben Perez, Rodolfo Cristobal. This film marks the first venture of lead star Fernando Poe Jr. and Zaldy Zshornack as film producers.

Cast 
 Fernando Poe Jr.
 Zaldy Zshornack
 Cielito Legaspi
 Ben Perez
 Rodolfo Cristobal
 Ramon Revilla
 Oscar Keese
 Loretta De Lara
 Nello Nayo
 Aida Villegas
 Paquito Diaz
 Elvira Reyes
 Dely Atay-atayan
 Francisco Cruz
 Johnny Long
 Boy Soriano
 Tony Montes
 Delly Villanueva
 Alex de Long
 Bino Garcia
 Dencio Padilla
 Armando Araneta
 Vicente Santiago
 Violeta Mayo
 Terry Gonzales

Awards and nominations

References 

Films directed by Pablo Santiago